Senator Coppola may refer to:

Alfred Coppola (fl. 2000s–2010s), New York State Senate
Marc A. Coppola (born 1967/68), New York State Senate